The Temporary National Representation, also the Provisional Representation, was the first parliamentary body formed in the newly proclaimed Kingdom of Serbs, Croats and Slovenes. It convened on March 1, 1919. The representatives were selected by the Serbian National Assembly representing the Kingdom of Serbia and the National Council of Slovenes, Croats and Serbs representing the State of Slovenes, Croats and Serbs.

The representation passed the Law on the election of national representatives in the Constitutional Assembly on September 3, 1920. The representation existed until the elections of November 28, 1920.

Representatives by region
Total: 296 representatives
State of Slovenes, Croats and Serbs
Triune Kingdom of Croatia, Slavonia, and Dalmatia (with Rijeka, Međimurje and part of Istria): 62
Slovene lands: 32
Kingdom of Dalmatia: 16
Bosnia and Herzegovina: 42
Kingdom of Serbia
Kingdom of Serbia: 108
Banat, Bačka and Baranja: 24
Kingdom of Montenegro: 12

Representatives
Didak Buntić
Stanislav Deželić
Ivan Ribar (Democratic Party)

References

Government of Yugoslavia
Kingdom of Yugoslavia
Politics of Yugoslavia
1919 establishments in Yugoslavia
1920 disestablishments in Yugoslavia